New Mersey Shopping Park is an out of town retail park located in Speke, Liverpool, England. It opened in 1985.

There are parking spaces for approximately 1,850 vehicles. A leisure area opened in 2018 and features a Cineworld 11-screen cinema, Nando's, Wagamama, TGI Fridays,Zizzi,Pizza Express,Yo Sushi,Hollywood Bowl and Ninja Warrior UK.

References

External links
 Mersey Shopping Park website
 New Mersey Shopping Park on CompletelyRetail

Shopping centres in Liverpool
Retail parks in the United Kingdom